Philip Rose may refer to:
 Sir Philip Rose, 1st Baronet (1816–1883), British lawyer
 Philip Rose (theatrical producer) (1921–2011), Broadway theatrical producer
 Philip H. Rose (born 1946), American politician in the Ohio House of Representatives

See also
 Phil Rose (born 1952), English actor